Ivica Miljković (born 1 August 1947 in Slavonski Brod) is a former Croatian football player.

Club career
Miljković made a name for himself playing for Dinamo Zagreb and in the period from 1969 to 1977 he appeared in a total of 232 Yugoslav First League matches, scoring 24 goals for the Blues. In 1977, he moved to NK Osijek where he spent the following three seasons. In 1980, he went abroad and spent the last two years of his career at NASL side Chicago Sting, helping them win the 1981 NASL championship.

International career
He was capped once for Yugoslavia, in a Euro 1976 qualifier against Northern Ireland held on 16 March 1975 at Windsor Park in which he came on late for Jure Jerković.

References

External links

Ivica Miljković at the Serbia national football team website 

1947 births
Living people
Sportspeople from Slavonski Brod
Association football defenders
Yugoslav footballers
Yugoslavia international footballers
GNK Dinamo Zagreb players
NK Osijek players
Chicago Sting (NASL) players
Yugoslav First League players
North American Soccer League (1968–1984) players
Yugoslav expatriate footballers
Expatriate soccer players in the United States
Yugoslav expatriate sportspeople in the United States